Cheryl McKay is an American author and screenwriter, from Los Angeles, California.

McKay holds an M.A. in Screenwriting from Regent University in Virginia, and is a winner of the 2006/2007 Art Within Labs award.

She wrote the screen adaptations of Jim Stovall's novel The Ultimate Gift and Sheila Walsh's children's book Gigi: God's Little Princess. McKay wrote Taylor's Wall and The Wild & Wacky Totally True Bible Stories series, narrated by Frank Peretti.

McKay cowrote Never the Bride with Rene Gutteridge

References

External links
Official Ultimate Gift Site (site requires cookies)

Year of birth missing (living people)
Living people
Christian writers
Regent University alumni